Passion Fruit was a German Eurodance trio. The original members were Blade (Manye Thompson), Dawn (Viola Schubbe), Pearl (Carla Sinclair) and MC Steve (Mario Zuber). The later formation was made up of the trio Nathaly van het Ende, María Serrano Serrano, and Debby St. Maarten.

Named after the tropical fruit, Passion Fruit got their start in June 1999 with the top 10 dance-pop hit "The Rigga-Ding-Dong-Song". The songs "Wonderland", "Sun Fun Baby" and "Bongo Man" followed in 2000 and 2001, all making the top 40 on the German singles chart. "I'm Dreaming of... A Winter Wonderland" was released posthumously in December 2001 just a week after the group was involved in a massive plane accident that killed María and Nathaly on 24 November of the same year.

Passion Fruit originally sang "The Rigga Ding Dong Song", which was the group's most successful single. The single reached the top 10 in 14 countries, including in Germany, Austria and Switzerland and top 20 in the Netherlands. It became a number 1 hit in Mexico. The original line-up can be seen in the single's cover sleeve and music video. Besides the main 3 minutes 25 seconds Radio Mix, there were three other mixes, the Extended Mix (5:12), the Plastic Bubble Mix (5:03) and the Munsta Groove Mix (5:41). Exactly ten years after the Passion Fruit release, in 2009, the German pop group Cherona released its version titled "Rigga-Ding-Dong-Song", dropping the definite article "the" from the title. The Cherona version on Columbia Records, accompanied by a music video, became a minor hit for them in Germany and Austria. The song appeared on the band's 2009 album Sound of Cherona.

First line-up

 Blade (Manye Thompson) 

 Dawn (Viola Schubbe)

 Pearl (Carla Sinclair) 

 MC Steve (Mario Zuber)

The first line up was established in June 1999 after the release of "The Rigga-Ding-Dong-Song", but the line up soon parted ways in October due to tensions and musical differences.

Second line-up
Nathaly van het Ende (born. 2 January 1975 in Amsterdam, Netherlands – died. 24 November 2001) (aged 26) 
María Serrano Serrano (born. 26 November 1973 in Madrid, Spain – died. 24 November 2001) (aged 27) 
Debby St. Maarten (born. 1973 in Delft, Netherlands) (age 50) 
The second line up replaced the first line up in January 2000 with the release of "Wonderland" and they continued to perform live and released the singles "Sun Fun Baby (Looky Looky)", "Bongo Man", and "I'm Dreaming Of...A Winter Wonderland" and the album Spanglish Love Affairs. In October 2001 the trio appeared in the German Playboy Magazine with a photo of them topless.

Plane crash
On 24 November 2001, after the group gave their final performance in Leipzig for Coca-Cola, they boarded Crossair Flight 3597 to travel from Berlin to Zurich. During the flight's final approach to Zurich Airport, the captain made a fatal decision by descending too early while attempting to spot the runway due to poor visibility and failing to read the DME which would have told him how far from the runway he actually was.  This caused the plane to crash into a forest and catch on fire in Bassersdorf just 2.5 miles near the runway at Zurich Airport. María and Nathaly perished along with former La Bouche vocalist Melanie Thornton and 21 other people, while Debby survived along with 8 other people. Debby was rushed to the Hospital to receive treatment for her wounds and doctors discovered that she had second and third degree burns on her hands and face and multiple bruises. "I'm Dreaming of... A Winter Wonderland" was released posthumously on 3 December 2001 and the royalties the single made were donated to the victims families and survivors of the accident. After the single was released the Passion Fruit act became discontinued and no more singles or albums were released. María is now a member of the 27 Club.

Post-accident
From 2002-2006, Debby continued to have ongoing treatment for her injuries. She occasionally posted messages on the official Passion Fruit website, usually each November around the anniversary of the plane crash to remember María and Nathaly. On 5 December 2006, she appeared in an interview on the ZDF television show Hallo Deutschland which showed her visiting the site of the crash with her family and she announced that she had recorded some songs for her comeback album, one of them was called "Girls"; however, due to her health and other personal reasons, she was not ready for her comeback and the album was eventually shelved by her manager. In 2007, after Debby fully recovered, she moved back to her home town in The Netherlands to work as a social worker.  She was interviewed for the 20th anniversary of the crash on 24 November 2021.

Second album release and other material
Passion Fruit was working on their second studio album in mid 2001 shortly before the accident. Only two singles were released during the period: "Bongo Man" and "I'm Dreaming Of...A Winter Wonderland". The second album would have been the first release under their new label Edel, but it was shelved after the events of the accident. The single "Bongo Man" featured the song "Passion Gang" as a bonus track. The other single, "I'm Dreaming of...A White Christmas", was released on the single "I'm Dreaming of...A Winter Wonderland", including the song, an altered version called "I'm Dreaming of...A Winter Wonderland" with mainly the same lyrics but different chorus lines, and two mixes of the "Winter Wonderland" version.

The song "P.A.S.S.I.O.N." was recorded by the first line-up in 1999 for the album Spanglish Love Affairs but was later cut. It was later released on the single "Sun Fun Baby (Looky Looky)" as a bonus track.

The 2004 single "Kiss Me (Na, Na, Na)" by Leticia, who recorded vocals for most Passion Fruit releases, under the label Edel, is believed to have been meant for Passion Fruit, likely for the shelved second album.

"I'm Dreaming of... A Winter Wonderland" is the only Passion Fruit single that is available worldwide on streaming services after it was released in 2014, the other singles were exclusively released on CD's.

The real voices of Passion Fruit
The main vocals for the majority of the songs were credited to Cuban-German singer Leticia Pareja Padron and the raps were credited to German rapper Kenneth Clemmons from Flensburg.This meant that both line ups were performing the songs through lip-synching. "I'm Dreaming of... A Winter Wonderland" was the only single that the second line-up was credited for the vocals.

Discography

Albums
 Spanglish Love Affairs (1 September 2000)

Singles

References

External links
 Passion Fruit biography, news, discography at Bubblegum Dancer

Eurodance groups
Musical groups established in 1999
Victims of aviation accidents or incidents in Switzerland
2001 deaths
Pop artists
Girl groups